Wila Qullu (Aymara wila red, blood red, qullu mountain, "red mountain", other spellings Huila Kkollu, Huilacollo, Vila Kkollu, Vilacollo, Wila Collu, Wila Khollu, Wila Kkollu, Wila Kollu, Wila Qollu, Willa Kkollu, Wilacollo, Wilacolo, Wilakhollu, Wilakkollu) may refer to:

Mountain
 Wila Qullu (Bolivia-Chile), in the Llica Municipality, Daniel Campos Province, Potosí Department, Bolivia; Tarapacá Region, Chile
 Wila Qullu (Challapata), southeast of Chunkara Lake in the Challapata Canton, Challapata Municipality, Challapata Province Province, Oruro Department, Bolivia
 Wila Qullu (Chunkara), at Chunkara Lake in the Challapata Canton, Challapata Municipality, Challapata Province Province, Oruro Department, Bolivia
 Wila Qullu (Cochabamba), in the Cochabamba Department, Bolivia
 Wila Qullu (Curahuara de Carangas), in the Curahuara de Carangas Municipality, Sajama Province, Oruro Department, Bolivia
 Wila Qullu (Ingavi), in the Ingavi Province, La Paz Department, Bolivia
 Wila Qullu (Inquisivi), in the Inquisivi Province, La Paz Department, Bolivia
 Wila Qullu (K'ulta), near K'ulta in the Challapata Municipality, Challapata Province Province, Oruro Department, Bolivia
 Wila Qullu (La Paz), in the Murillo Province, La Paz Department, Bolivia
 Wila Qullu (Moquegua-Puno), on the border of the Moquegua Region and the Puno Region, Peru
 Wila Qullu (Pacajes), in the Pacajes Province, La Paz Department, Bolivia
 Wila Qullu (Palca), in the Palca District, Tacna Province, Tacna Region, Peru
 Wila Qullu (Potosí), in the Potosí Department, Bolivia
 Wila Qullu (Tacna), in the Candarave Province, Tacna Region, Peru
 Wila Qullu (Tarata), in the Tarata Province, Tacna Region, Peru
 Wila Qullu (Qutallani), near Qutallani in the Turco Municipality, Sajama Province, Oruro Department, Bolivia
 Wila Qullu (Sabaya), in the Sabaya Municipality, Sabaya Province, Oruro Department, Bolivia
 Wila Qullu (Turco), in the west of the Turco Municipality, Sajama Province, Oruro Department, Bolivia

Places 
 Wila Qullu, San José de Kala, in the San José de Kala Canton, Corque Municipality, Carangas Province Province, Oruro Department, Bolivia
 Wila Qullu, Villa Esperanza, in the Villa Esperanza Canton, Corque Municipality, Carangas Province Province, Oruro Department, Bolivia
 Wila Qullu, Challapata, in the Challapata Municipality, Challapata Province Province, Oruro Department, Bolivia